The European Biophysical Societies' Association is an association existing to promote Biophysics in Europe and to disseminate "knowledge of the principles, recent developments and applications of biophysics, and to foster the exchange of scientific information among European biophysicists and biophysicists in general".

Origins
At the end of the 1970s, there appeared to be an interest in creating a formal association of various existing European Biophysical Societies. In November 1981, a meeting organized by the German Biophysical Society set the stage for developing concrete “aims of the Association…namely to promote scientific contacts and cooperation with the organization of joint meetings.”  

EBSA was established in 1984, at the 8th IUPAB Congress of Biophysics, held in Bristol, after representatives from 8 European Biophysical Societies (Belgian, British, Danish, German, Italian, Netherlands, Swedish and Swiss) met to develop and sign a founding constitution and rules of association.  

It was also in 1984 that the journal Biophysics of Structure and Mechanism became the European Biophysics Journal, published by Springer-Verlag. Since 2000, EBJ has been owned entirely by EBSA and it is currently available free of charge to its members. Ownership of the journal has provided a financial base from which EBSA undertakes many of its activities.

Activities

Because biophysics is a unique combination of diverse scientific subjects, particularly fertile with the advancement of biotechnology and quantitative and analytical methods in biology, EBSA’s has a prolific range of activities geared towards bringing innovative people and ideas together. Every two years EBSA organizes the European Biophysics Congress. The 9th Congress was held in Lisbon, Portugal, in 2013.  The 2015 Congress was held in Dresden, Germany, in 2017 it was held in Edinburgh, Scotland  while in 2019 in Madrid, Spain.  The next congress will be held in Vienna, in July 2021. 
In addition, EBSA offers a variety of sponsorship to institutions and individuals working towards promoting biophysics in Europe, such as organisers of European biophysics meetings and schools with biophysics courses.  

EBSA also offers bursaries to young scientists to attend scientific meetings and to participate in the Biophysics Congress, as well as the Young Investigators’ Medal and Prize, which is awarded every Congress. In 2000, the recipient of the medal was Justin Molley, from York, UK; in 2003, it was Martin Weik, from Grenoble, France; in 2005, it was Gyorgy Panyi, from Debrecen, Hungary; in 2007, it was Marc Baldus, from Göttingen, Germany; in 2009, it was Michel Valle, from Derio-Bizkaia, Spain; and in 2011, it was Kinneret Keren.

Organisation

EBSA membership includes a total of 25 societies throughout Europe. The Executive Committee is composed of ten members drawn from different member societies, and includes a President, Vice-President, Past-President, Secretary, Treasurer and Managing Editor of EBJ. During a General Assembly, the voting representative of each Member Society and a non-voting representative are invited to attend and consider a number of issues and “discuss the direction of EBSA”.

References

External links 
 European Biophysical Societies' Association
 European Biophysics Journal

See also 
 Biophysics
 :fr:Société française de biophysique
  Sociedade Portuguesa de Biofísica

Biophysics organizations